Sulur Road is a railway station in the Coimbatore suburb of Sulur, Tamil Nadu, India.

References

Salem railway division
Railway stations in Coimbatore district
Railway stations in Coimbatore